Mezinov is a Russian masculine surname, its feminine counterpart is Mezinova. Notable people with the surname include:

Tatiana Mezinova, Russian Paralympic athlete 

Russian-language surnames